The Palazzo Giustinian is a palace in Venice, northern Italy, situated in the Dorsoduro district and overlooking the Grand Canal next to Ca' Foscari. It is among the best examples of the late Venetian Gothic and was the final residence of Princess Louise of Artois.

History and description
 

The edifice was built in the late 15th century, perhaps with the participation of Bartolomeo Bon. The palace consisted originally of two separated sectors, one for each branch of the family, which were later joined by a façade; these are the Ca' Giustinian dei Vescovi (now housing part of the Ca' Foscari University) and the Ca' Giustinian dalle Zogie (now privately owned). Behind the façade, they are separated by an alley which, through a sottoportego, or portico-tunnel, connects to the central portal.

The two sub-palaces share numerous decorative features with the annexed Ca' Foscari. They have an L-shaped plan with four floors, the upper ones having mullioned windows. At the piano nobile they form a six-arches arcade with an interwoven motif of multi-lobes circles. The single windows are ogival, or decorated with a three-lobe motif. Ca' Giustinian dei Vescovi has in the rear a court with a Gothic staircase, while Ca' Giustinian delle Zogie has a large garden.

Owners and notable residents

The family  sold the palazzo in the 19th century. Since then, personalities such as painter Natale Schiavoni, German composer Richard Wagner (who wrote the second act of Tristan und Isolde here between 1858 and 1859),  the last Duchess of Parma, Louise d'Artois, and Hungarian violinist Franz von Vecsey have lived here. George Eliot was staying there with J. W. Cross during her honeymoon in 1880.

Ca' Giustinian dei Vescovi now houses part of the Ca' Foscari University, and Ca' Giustinian dalle Zogie is now privately owned.

See also
Palazzo Giustinian Lolin
Palazzo Giustinian Pesaro
Palazzo Giustinian Recanati

References

Houses completed in the 15th century
Giustinian
Giustinian
Gothic architecture in Venice
House of Giustiniani
Venetian Gothic architecture